Majekodunmi Fasheke, popularly known as Majek Fashek (March 1963 – 1 June 2020) was a Nigerian singer-songwriter and guitarist. His 1988 album Prisoner of Conscience included the single "Send Down the Rain", which won six PMAN Music Awards. Also known as The Rainmaker, he worked with various artists worldwide including Tracy Chapman, Jimmy Cliff, Michael Jackson, Snoop Dogg, and Beyoncé

Early life
Fashek was born in Benin City to an Edo mother and an Ijesha father in 1963, but identified mainly with his Benin roots. Various translations of his name Fasheke (Ifá à ṣe èké) include "powers of miracles" and "divination does not lie", however, it refers to the orisha (deity) Ifa (deity of divination) of the Yoruba religion and means "Ifa does not lie/deceive." After his parents separated, Fashek remained in Benin City  with his mother, and later joined the choir in his local Aladura church where he learned to play the trumpet and guitar whilst composing songs for the choir.

Musical career

Early 80's: Jastix
In the early eighties Fashek, who at the time went by the stage name Rajesh Kanal, joined the group Jastix with musicians Amos McRoy Gregg and Black Rice. The trio soon gained popularity as the in-house band on the NTA Benin show Music Panorama, and toured with fellow reggae group The Mandators. Jastix were also session musicians for up and coming reggae singer Edi Rasta, who would later be known as Evi-Edna Ogholi.

1987–1990: Prisoner of Conscience and I&I Experience
In 1987, shortly after Jastix disbanded, Fashek, who now used the name Majek Fashek, signed with Tabansi Records and began a solo career, releasing the album Prisoner of Conscience and quickly becoming Nigeria's top reggae artist after the song "Send Down The Rain" became the most popular song of the year. In 1989, he won six PMAN awards for "Song of the Year", "Album of the Year", and "Reggae Artist of the Year" among others. Fashek's next album, I&I Experience, was released in late 1989 under the Tabansi Label and included the anti-apartheid anthem "Free Africa, Free Mandela" which sampled Steam's Na Na Hey Hey Kiss Him Goodbye.

1991: So Long Too Long and American invasion
After leaving Tabansi Records, Fashek was signed to CBS Nigeria in the early 1990s and released So Long Too Long. It was included on Putumayo World Music's first album. In 1990 he was signed to Interscope Records and released the critically acclaimed album Spirit Of Love, produced by "Little Steven" Van Zandt.  In 1992, he appeared on Late Night with David Letterman in support of his new 1991 album, and performed the song "So Long Too Long" for the television audience.
Flame Tree released The Best of Majek Fashek in 1994. He was later dropped by Interscope before moving to Mango, a division of Island Records accustomed to marketing reggae internationally. His first album for the company included a cover version of Bob Marley's "Redemption Song". He has recorded several albums for various labels since, including Rainmaker for Tuff Gong (1997) and Little Patience for Coral (2004).

Musical style
Fashek's musical influences include Bob Marley – whom he resembled vocally – Jimi Hendrix, and Fela Kuti. He was one of the original Nigerian artists drawn to Caribbean music, specifically reggae, rather than indigenous hybrids such as fuji, jùjú, but was known to mix these genres to create his own style he called kpangolo, and the song "My Guitar", an ode to his favourite instrument, was heavily influenced by rock.

Other works
Fashek had a supporting role in the 2000 Nollywood movie Mark of the Beast, and starred in a commercial for non-alcoholic beverage Diamalt. In 2016 he performed to audience of over 10,000 people in a comedy show hosted by Ayo Makun in Eko Hotel Hall, Lagos.

In November 2016 Fashek contributed the song "We Are Not Afraid" to a video directed by former 10CC member Kevin Godley featuring over 200 celebrities including 53 members of the Rock and Roll Hall of Fame to raise funds for the International Rescue Committee (IRC) and Human Rights Watch (HRW).

Personal life
Fashek was married to Rita Fashek who inspired the song "Without You"; the couple had four children together, but later divorced. In 2015, it was revealed that Fashek was bankrupt and battling drug addiction. After admitting that he needed help, he was admitted into a drug rehabilitation centre in Abuja, where he recovered and returned to music.

Death
Besides his struggle with drug addiction, other health conditions required Fashek's hospitalisation on several occasions. He was rumored dead in September 2019 but his manager quelled the rumors, confirming that Fashek had indeed been critically ill, hospitalized at the Queen Elizabeth Hospital, London in the UK, and in dire need of financial assistance. Billionaire businessman and philanthropist Femi Otedola pledged to cover all the singer's medical expenses.

Fashek died in his sleep on 1 June 2020 in New York City.  He was 57, and was battling esophageal cancer.

Discography

Studio albums

See also
 African reggae
 Music of Nigeria
 Nigerian reggae

Notes

External links
Majek Fashek interview
Majek Focus
 
StackPath

20th-century Nigerian male actors
Nigerian Rastafarians
2020 deaths
Yoruba musicians
Musicians from Benin City
Nigerian reggae musicians
Reggae guitarists
Nigerian singer-songwriters
1949 births
21st-century Nigerian male singers
Nigerian male television actors